Gaud Sarang is a raga in Hindustani classical music that combines characteristics of Sarang and the now extinct raga named Gaud. Unlike most other members of the Sarang family of ragas, Gaud Sarang is assigned to the Kalyan thaat rather than the usual Kafi.

The Indian National Anthem Jana gana mana is sung in the raga Gaud Sarang.  It is believed that the National Anthem of India is in raga Bilaval, but it isn't like that. There is a certain svara which is changes the whole raga of the Anthem. In the national anthem, the  Madhyama svara is employed. Raga Bilaval doesn't have the svara of  Madhyama (obviously, raga Bilaval is the raga of all Shuddha Svaras and no other types of svaras). But raga Gaud Sarang has the  Madhyama svara. So from this, the National Anthem of India, Jana gana mana is in raga Gaud Sarang.

Theory
Arohana: 

Avarohana:

Notes

References

Sources
 
 

Hindustani ragas